Joseph Stenson Hooker (1853–1946) L.R.C.P., L.R.C.S. was a British physician, naturopath, vegetarianism activist and writer.

Biography

Hooker was born in Luton. He obtained his MD from Durham University in 1899. He practised in West London and contributed papers
to The Lancet journal. He was firmly established within the medical profession but later came out against it. After Thomas Allinson died, he took over his address at Spanish Place, Manchester Square. Hooker criticized the use of drugs and advocated exercise, fresh air and a vegetarian diet. He also promoted naturopathic therapies such as bathing his patients in a coloured light bath, hypnotic suggestion, prayer and psychotherapeutics.

Hook was a Vice-President of the naturopathic Psycho-Therapeutic Society which was founded in 1901 for the "Study, Investigation, and Practice of Health Reform, Medical Hypnosis, Suggestive Therapeutics, Curative Human Radiations, and Drugless Healing, with due regard to Diet, Hygiene, and the observance of Natural Laws of Health". Hooker stated that mind over matter had a "tremendous power" and predicted that the work of the Psycho-Therapeutic Society "would undoubtedly develop in view of increase in nervous disease".

Hooker and his wife joined the British Nature Cure Association in 1907 and were on its executive committee. He was the only registered practitioner in the organization. He was medical secretary of the London Association for the Prevention of Premature Burial.

Hooker was an anti-vaccinationist and anti-vivisectionist. He was Vice-President of the British Union for the Abolition of Vivisection and President of their Edgeware branch.

Because of his unorthodox naturopathic views about therapy, Hooker came into came into conflict with the medical establishment. In 1925, he was brought before the General Medical Council and was found "guilty of infamous conduct in a professional respect" for promoting an alleged "consumption cure" known as Newell treatment that was published in the John Bull magazine. The Newell treatment was proposed by Oliver Newell, a bacteriologist with no medical qualifications. Hooker did not disclose the formula to the remedy which was considered unprofessional. Hooker was also charged with sending letters supportive of the Newell treatment to patients not under his care but whom he had hoped to secure as his patients for his own professional advantage. The Council considered this an undoubted case of advertising and Hooker's name was erased from the Medical Register.

In the 1930s, Hooker took interest in herbalism. In 1942 aged 89, Hooker was re-instated on the Medical Register. He became a member of the British Medical Association.

Hooker was active until his sudden death in 1946, aged 93.

Vegetarianism

Hooker was a vegetarian in his personal life and recommended a vegetarian diet to his patients. Hooker was an advocate of fasting. In 1910, he fasted for two weeks. He preferred two meals a day. Hooker spoke at conferences for the Vegetarian Society.

N-rays

Hooker developed Prosper-René Blondlot's N-ray theory. He held the view that all organisms emit N-rays and they are coloured differently depending on mental and physical factors of the individual.

Selected publications

An Unusually Severe Case of Syphilis Acquired Without any Primary Sore (The Lancet, 1884)
A New Light and Colour Bath (The Lancet, 1903)
Electric-Light Baths for Hospitals (The Lancet, 1904)
Human and Plant Rays (The Lancet, 1904)
Human Rays and Their Spectra (The Lancet, 1904)
The Trend of Modern Medicine (1905)
The Letters of Little Mary (1905)
The Higher Medicine (1907)
How Not to Grow Old (1913)
On Learning to Breathe (1913)
A New Suggestion Treatment: Without Hypnotism (1914)
A Spiritual Basis of Health (1921)
The Newer Practice of Medicine (1932)
The Humane Family Doctor (1937)

References

1853 births
1946 deaths
20th-century English medical doctors
Alternative cancer treatment advocates
Alternative medicine activists
Alumni of Durham University College of Medicine
Anti-vivisectionists
British anti-vaccination activists
British vegetarianism activists
Fasting advocates
Herbalists
Naturopaths
People associated with the Vegetarian Society